New Clark City station is a proposed railway station located on the North–South Commuter Railway in Tarlac, Philippines.

History 
A rail link from Clark International Airport to the capital was originally planned in the 1990s. The first proposal, called the "Manila–Clark rapid railway system", was discontinued due to disagreement on funding. In the early 2000s, the NorthRail project was pursued. This involved the conversion the rail gauge from narrow gauge to standard gauge, and linking Manila to Malolos, Bulacan and eventually to Clark and the airport. While the project commenced in 2007, it was repeatedly halted due to allegations of overpricing, then discontinued in 2011. The project was revived as the North–South Commuter Railway.

Design
The station will be constructed as part of the second phase of the North–South Commuter Railway. Without a railway wye to link the station with Clark International Airport, there are no direct segments linking the two stations.

References

Philippine National Railways stations
Railway stations in Pampanga
Proposed railway stations in the Philippines
Airport railway stations